George Stafford Whitby (1887–1972) was the head of the University of Akron rubber laboratory and for many years was the only person in the United States who taught rubber chemistry.   Whitby received the Charles Goodyear Medal in 1954 and in 1972, he was inducted into the International Rubber Science Hall of Fame.  In 1986 the Rubber Division established the George Stafford Whitby Award in his honor.

Personal

Whitby was born in Hull, England on May 23, 1887.  He immigrated to the United States in 1942, becoming an American citizen in 1946.  He died at Delray Beach, Florida on January 10, 1972.

Education

Whitby received the BS degree in 1907 from the Royal College of Science in London.  He obtained MS and PhD degrees from McGill University in 1918 and 1920.

Career

Upon completing his undergraduate education in 1907, Whitby served as a chemist for the Societe Financiere des Caoutchoucs in Malaysia.  After completing his graduate education, he accepted an appointment as a full professor at McGill University in 1923.  In 1929, he accepted a position as director of the chemical division of the National Chemical Research Council of Canada.  He joined the University of Akron faculty in 1942, and retired in 1954.

Awards
 1928 - Colwyn medal
 1954 - Charles Goodyear Medal 
 1972 - Inducted into the International Rubber Science Hall of Fame.

References

External links
 Oral history on George S. Whitby

1887 births
1972 deaths
Polymer scientists and engineers
U.S. Synthetic Rubber Program
University of Akron faculty
British emigrants to the United States